Johannot is a surname. Notable people with the surname include:

Alfred Johannot (1800–1837), French painter and engraver
Tony Johannot (1803–1852), French engraver, illustrator and painter

French-language surnames